Terry Bivins (born September 13, 1943) is a retired NASCAR Winston Cup Series driver whose career spanned from 1975 to 1977. Bivins had a career-best finish of fifth in 28 races. He finished disputed second for the 1976 NASCAR Rookie of the Year.

Career

Early career
Bivins began racing in 1964 with a used 1955 Ford car that he bought at a car lot. He added a roll cage to the car and started racing using the snow tires that came with the car.

NASCAR career
Bivins ran two NASCAR races in 1975, with a best finish of ninth at Michigan International Speedway.

He ran for NASCAR Rookie of the Year in 1976. Bivins shared a shop with Richard Childress in Winston-Salem, North Carolina. Bivins competed in 18 of 30 events with 6 Top 10 finishes and his career-best finish of fifth at the 1976 Richmond 400 at Richmond Fairgrounds Raceway. Bivins finished in a disputed second place for the Rookie of the Year to Skip Manning. Bivins was announced as the Rookie of the Year after the Ontario Motor Speedway race. Bivins was quoted by the Emporia Gazette in 2007, "I won the Rookie of the Year. We had a celebration dinner. They turned that around and gave it to Skip Manning. (Manning's sponsor) went to NASCAR and told them if his guy didn’t win the sponsor would pull out.”

Bivins competed in 8 of 30 events with 1 Top 10 during the 1977 season before retiring from racing out of frustration from losing the Rookie of the Year crown.

For starting an average of 20th place and finishing an average of 17th, Bivins earned a grand total of $61,725 in total prize winnings. Bivins raced from the age of 31 to the age of 33.

Career after NASCAR
After retiring from NASCAR, Bivins drove a limited schedule for the ASA before putting a hiatus to his stock car career in 1980. In 2010, Bivins has resumed racing career in a Modified.

Terry later raced at Lakeside Speedway in Kansas City, Kansas in the Grand National Class. Car #5 and he won three feature races in 2018. He then moved to B-Mods in 2019, 2020 and 2021 when he lived in Lebo, Kansas.   Bivins retired from racing in the middle of 2021 with health issues. He had over 400 wins in his career despite not racing during 30 of the years between his first and last race. He won track championships on both pavement and dirt at Lakeside and I-70 Speedway.

Personal life
After retiring from NASCAR, he started his own construction company. Bivins later was a professional fisherman. 

Throughout his career, Bivins received help from his stepfather Jim and mother Kate Jones. Bivins is married to Claudia Bivins. She was always on his pit crew, whether as a video recorder or helping repair the car. Bivins' son James Bivins helped on his pit crew for several decades.

Career Honors
Bivins was elected in the first class (2004) into the Central Auto Racing Boosters Hall of Fame for drivers in the Kansas City area.

References

1943 births
NASCAR drivers
ARCA Menards Series drivers
American Speed Association drivers
People from Johnson County, Kansas
Living people
Racing drivers from Kansas